Echo (stylized as ECHO) is a stealth video game released on 19 September 2017. It was developed and published by Danish indie studio Ultra Ultra. The game takes place in a planetwide palace that creates echoes of the player, and teaches them the actions of the player. The game was not a financial success, and was the only game released by Ultra Ultra before it shut down. However, a film adaptation is still in development.

Plot 
ECHO is a science fiction story in a future where advanced technology has been used to colonize distant planets. Most societies are governed by advanced artificial intelligences. En is a woman from a "Resourceful" group of genetically modified humans. Her AI companion London pilots her ship, and frequently argues with her because she was involved in a violent incident that led to the death of his former human partner Foster.

London wakes En from a decades-long cryogenic stasis when they arrive at a planet whose coordinates she obtained from the now-deceased Foster. The planet is densely packed with repetitive structures, which London believes was built by an automated self-replicating colonization probe.

The structures appear to be uninhabited when En begins exploring the planet. She calls the planet a "Palace" because of its ornate and spacious appearance, and claims to recognize many of the Palace's structures and concepts from her Resourceful upbringing. She discusses this with London over her radio, and London is skeptical that the Palace is anything more deliberate than a malfunctioning artificial intelligence. After a short time, the structure begins to create violent, mindless clones of En which she dubs "Echoes."

Gameplay 
ECHO's gameplay revolves around an adaptive AI function. The game's world is a Palace which creates copies of En, the player character. Echoes serve as the game's main enemies, which the Palace modifies to adapt to En's behavior. The Palace undergoes a cycle, at the end of which there is a Blackout. While the power is on, the Palace records all of En's actions. The player is notified of their actions being recorded by En leaving a bright outline of herself behind when she performs an action the Palace recognizes. A blackout will occur once the palace has recorded a sufficient amount of information, thus preventing players from simply standing still. Once the Blackout occurs, all recorded actions are taught to the Echoes, and previous known actions are deleted. For example, if En is seen shooting her gun, vaulting a low wall and opening a door, the Echoes will have the ability to do the same in the next cycle. If En refrains from doing any of those things during that cycle, they will have forgotten how to do so by the next one. During Blackouts, the Palace cannot record En's actions, leaving the player free to act as they wish. However, existing Echoes can still kill them.

Reception 

ECHO received "generally favorable reviews" from critics, according to review aggregator Metacritic.

ECHO won four major awards at "Spilprisen 2018", the Danish Game Awards - Best Visual Design, Best Sound, Best Technical achievement, and Game of the Year 

The game was nominated for "Best Art Direction (Games)" at the 2018 Webby Awards, and the Excellence in Visual Art award at the 2018 Independent Games Festival.

References

2017 video games
Action video games
Indie video games
PlayStation 4 games
Science fiction video games
Stealth video games
Unreal Engine games
Video games developed in Denmark
Video games featuring female protagonists
Windows games
Single-player video games